N'dea Jones (born May 25, 1999) is an American professional basketball player who plays for BC Enisey of the VTB United League. She played college basketball for the Texas A&M Aggies and was drafted 23rd overall in the 2021 WNBA draft. She plays the power forward position.

Jones was born in Lawrenceville, Georgia. She attended Brookwood High School, where she averaged 17.7 points at 13.9 rebounds. She was the #79 recruit going into college and the #18 forward. Jones, a 4-star recruit, committed to Texas A&M in 2016.

Jones became Texas A&M's all-time leader in rebounds and double-doubles. She received All-SEC honors and an AP All-American honorable mention her senior year. She was also honored by the U.S. Basketball Writers Association and Women's Basketball Coaches Association (WBCA) All-America team, becoming the fourth Texas A&M player to be named to all three, including AP honors, in one season. She led the Aggies to three Sweet 16 appearances in the NCAA basketball tournament, missing the round only when the tournament was canceled due to the COVID-19 pandemic.

Jones has been named to the Naismith Memorial Basketball Hall of Fame and was a Katrina McClain Award semifinalist, an award for the nation's top power forward, in 2021.

Jones declared for the WNBA Draft in March 2021, and was drafted by the Seattle Storm in the second round of the 2021 WNBA draft.  Jones was waived before the Storm's season opener.

Jones is currently in law school pursuing a jurisprudence degree.

References

Living people
1999 births
American women's basketball players
Basketball players from Georgia (U.S. state)
People from Lawrenceville, Georgia
Power forwards (basketball)
Seattle Storm draft picks
Texas A&M Aggies women's basketball players